Andrés Matías Matonte Cabrera (born 30 March 1988) is a Uruguayan professional football referee. On 19 May 2022 FIFA announced the 2022 FIFA World Cup's referee list, where Matonte was chosen.

Career
Matonte is a physical education teacher. He started his career as a referee in 2008. He made his debut in the Uruguayan Primera División in the match between Fénix and River Plate (0-0) in 2017.

He is FIFA referee since 2019 and was part of the referee list of 2021 FIFA Arab Cup, where he as he was summoned to officiate the match between United Arab Emirates and Qatar, and 2022 FIFA World Cup qualification (CONMEBOL).

References

Uruguayan football referees
Living people
1988 births
2022 FIFA World Cup referees